Crane School District 13  is a school district in Yuma County, Arizona.

References

External links
 

School districts in Yuma County, Arizona